Frédéric Schiffter (born 1956) is a French writer and philosopher.

Works 
1985: Métaphysique du frimeur. Lettre sur l'élégance, Éditions du Milan
1997: On Dandyism and George Brummell (preface)
1999: Guy Debord, l'atrabilaire, PUF
2001: Sur le blabla et le chichi des philosophes, PUF, coll. « Perspectives critiques », 
2002: Pensées d’un philosophe sous Prozac, Milan
2004: Le Plafond de Montaigne, Milan, coll. « Pause philo »
2004: Contre Debord, PUF, coll. « Perspectives critiques »
2005: Petite philosophie du surf, Milan
2006: Le Philosophe sans qualités, Flammarion
2007: Traité du cafard, 
2008: Le Bluff éthique, Flammarion
2009: Délectations moroses, Le Dilettante
2010: , Flammarion, (Prix Décembre 2010).
2012: La Beauté, une éducation esthétique, Autrement
2013: Le Charme des penseurs tristes, Flammarion, 
2014: Dictionnaire chic de philosophie, Écriture
2016: On ne meurt pas de chagrin, Flammarion,

References

External links 
 Frédéric Schiffter on data.bnf.fr
 Frédéric Schiffter, philosophe sans qualités, son blog
 Frédéric Schiffter on France Culture
 Entretien sur RFI autour du Bluff éthique (14 September 2008)
 « Pugnacité du cafard », interview (27 September 2008)
 « Le chichi, le blabla et le ganagan... », entretien pour Le Monde des religions, October 2010

21st-century French philosophers
21st-century French writers
Prix Décembre winners
1956 births
Living people